2 Squadron is a squadron in the South African Air Force which was formed in 1940. The squadron has a long history, having been involved in every single combat action in which the SAAF has taken part. During the Second World War it made a name for itself in the battles for East Africa, before distinguishing itself in North Africa as part of the Desert Air Force, and later in Italy.

World War II
The squadron was established on 1 October 1940, when the two flights of 1 Squadron SAAF that were operating in Kenya against the Italians in the East African campaign, were formed into a new squadron. The Kenya-based flights had operated independently from the remainder of 1 Squadron, based in the Sudan for several months, and two shootdowns of Italian aircraft made by the Kenya-based flights were retrospectively credited to the new squadron. Initial equipment of the new squadron was nine Hawker Furys fighters, nine Gloster Gladiators and five Hawker Hurricanes. In November, the Squadron's Gladiators were transferred to 1 Squadron SAAF, and on 3 January 1941, its Hurricanes were also passed to 1 Squadron SAAF, leving 2 Squadron equipped with Furys, supplemented by three old Gloster Gauntlets inherited from 430 Flight RAF. In March 1941, the squadron was planned to re-equip with Curtiss Mohawk IV fighters, but when the new aircraft were delivered to Mombassa their engines proved to be faulty, and had to be sent to Britain for repair. On 17 April the squadron's pilots were sent off to Egypt where the squadron would be re-equipped for service in the Western Desert campaign. The squadron claimed eight Italian aircraft shot down during the East African campaign.

On arrival in Egypt, the squadron received Hurricanes as temporary equipment until it could convert to its planned equipment of Curtiss Tomahawks. A detachment of the squadron's Hurricanes operated over the front from Sidi Haneish Airfield from the end of May while the rest of the squadron continued to work up on Tomahawks. By July 1941, it had fully converted to and was operational on the Tomahawk. 

During the initial years of the war, 2 Squadron served as part of 1 Bomber Brigade in the East African campaign and the North African campaign. After August 1943, it also saw action in Sicily, Italy and Yugoslavia.

During the Second World War the squadron operated the following aircraft:
 Hawker Hartebeest
 Hawker Fury I
 Gloster Gauntlet
 Gloster Gladiator II
 Hawker Hurricane
 Tomahawk IIB June 1941 – May 1942
 Kittyhawk I April 1942 – June 1943
 Kittyhawk III June 1943 – July 1943
 Supermarine Spitfire Vc July 1943 – March 1944
 Supermarine Spitfire IX February 1944 – July 1945

Korean War

The squadron was South Africa's contribution to the United Nations war effort during the Korean War from November 1950 to December 1953.
2 Squadron was attached to the 18th Fighter-Bomber Wing U.S. Air Force for the duration of the war. Initially flying the P-51 Mustang, the squadron re-equipped with the F-86 Sabre in February 1953. During the war the squadron flew a total of 12,067 sorties, most being dangerous ground attack missions. 74 of the 94 Mustangs and 4 out of the 22 Sabres were lost, along with 33 pilots (14 killed in action, 11 missing in action, 8 pilots killed in accident).

For its actions, the squadron received the Republic of Korea Presidential Unit Citation, United States Presidential Unit Citation, and numerous other awards and decorations.

The Commanding Officer of the 18th Fighter-Bomber Wing, issued a directive at the end of the war that:

Eleven Korean War SAAF casualties are buried at the United Nations Memorial Cemetery, Busan, South Korea.

After the Korean War 2 Squadron, based at Waterkloof AFB, was equipped with Canadair CL-13 Sabres. For a period the squadron was stationed at AFB Pietersburg.

The Border War and post 2000

Conversion to the new Mirage III occurred in 1963 and the squadron moved to AFB Hoedspruit at the end of 1978. The squadron fought in several engagements during the South-West Africa/Angola Border War.

They continued to fly the Mirages until October 1990. They later re-equipped with the Atlas Cheetah C and D, but remained 'on the books' during the hiatus between Mirage and Cheetah, not being officially disbanded at that point.  Reconnaissance was also performed using Vinten Vicon 18 Series 601 pod. Regular night flying was performed and the aircrew also performed air-to-air refuelling operations with the Boeing 707 aircraft of 60 Squadron, until these were retired in 2007. The squadron participated in the annual SANDF force preparation exercises which includes using live weapons. During joint exercises with the German Air Force in 2006, 40 live V3S "Snake" short-range air-to-air missiles were fired at the Denel Overberg Test Range.

Moving to Louis Trichardt (now AFB Makhado) in January 1993, 2 Squadron became the sole front line combat jet squadron in the SAAF.
Till 2 April 2008 the squadron operated the Cheetah C/D fighter aircraft and was equipped with 28 examples. The squadron flew 1010 hours in 2004.

The last of the Cheetahs were retired on 2 April 2008, later that month the first new JAS 39 Gripen arrived. The SAAF accepted its first Gripen D in April 2008 and the final two Gripen D aircraft arrived in South Africa in July 2009. The first two Gripen Cs arrived on 11 February 2010 with deliveries ongoing as at October 2011. The squadron operates all the SAAF's Gripens except for the first Gripen D, which is assigned to the Test Flight and Development Centre at AFB Overberg.

Aircraft operated 1945–present
 North American F-51D Mustang July 1945 – 1953
 North American F-86F Sabre 1953
 de Havilland Vampire 1953–56
 Canadair Sabre Mk.6 1956–63
 Dassault Mirage III 1963–89
 Atlas Cheetah C and D 1988–2008
 JAS 39 Gripen 2008–present

References

Bibliography

External links

 Unofficial South African Air Force website

Squadrons of the South African Air Force
Fighter aircraft units and formations
2 Squadron SAAF
United Nations contingents in Korea
SAAF2
Military units and formations established in 1940
South Africa–South Korea relations